Bartolo Pellegrino (26 October 1934 – 28 July 2019) was an Italian politician who served as a Sicilian Regional Deputy.

References

1934 births
2019 deaths
Italian politicians